Kani is a town in Sagaing Region, Myanmar. It is situated on the west bank of Chindwin river. Its township boundary is touched with ones of Mingin Township in the north and Budalin Township in the east. There are Pone Taung Hills in the west of the township. There are also many streams in the township. At the age of Myanmar dynasties, its area was wider ago. There is Shwe Myin Phyu Hill at the north. That hill was a city ago and so the remains of moats and castle area wall. Myin Phyu Shin Divinity which is famous in Myanmar now is Kani Nawyahtār who was the city governor of Kani when King Ah Nawyahtār governed the country. The mayor of Kani was the General of Shield army, who was father of Dye Khin Khin, at the age of King Si Paw. According to census at 1951, population of the town was just 2,500 people.

Distinction
The Kani town is famous with the name of Kani-Kané. A Great Buddhist Monk Kani Shwe Thein Taw Sayadaw was from Kamphyu at the township of Kani.

References

Township capitals of Myanmar
Populated places in Sagaing Region